PR5 or variation may refer to:

Places
 PR5 postcode, see PR postcode area
 Puerto Rico Highway 5 (PR-5)

Vehicles
 , a river gunboat
 APJ PR5, a motorcycle from AJP Motos
 PR-5 Wiewior plus, a UAV drone
 Rafaelyants PR-5, Soviet biplane bomber

Other uses
 PageRank
 Style Pr5 for runestones
 PR5, part of the Polish Radio External Service
 Phosphorane (PR5), the chemical class

See also
 PRS (disambiguation)